Conway School District (or Conway Public Schools) is a school district located in Conway, Arkansas, United States. Conway Public Schools serves the city of Conway, Arkansas, located in Faulkner County, Arkansas. With more than 10,000 students, Conway School District is the eighth largest in Arkansas. Starting August 20, 2012, the district will have 16 schools, including one high school, one junior high school, four middle schools, nine elementary schools and a preschool program.

Conway High School has experienced success in interscholastic sports and activities with conference and state titles. In 2010, the Wampus Cat football team took home the 7A conference championship. Also, winning the Arkansas State Championship in 2011 was baseball, wrestling and girls' soccer. Conway HS has a strong band program, with many students making all state band. In the 2011 War Memorial "Showcase of Bands" marching contest, the Wampus Cat there were also athletic scholarships in Ruth Doyle's name. Marching Band received the Brandon Award, the contest's highest award.

Wampus Cat

The Wampus Cat is a mythical creature that normally is portrayed as a cougar that can stand upright. This mascot is a variation of this with six arms. "Four to run at the speed of light and two to fight with all its might."

Schools

High School:
(10th - 12th grade)

 Conway High School

Junior High School:
(8th & 9th grades)
 Conway Junior High School

Middle Schools: 
(5th - 7th grades)
 Bob and Betty Courtway Middle School
 Carl Stuart Middle School
 Raymond and Phyllis Simon Middle School
 Ruth Doyle Middle School

Elementary Schools:
(Kindergarten - 4th grade)
 Carolyn Lewis Elementary School
 Ellen Smith Elementary School
 Florence Mattison Elementary School
 Ida Burns Elementary School
 Jim Stone Elementary School
 Julia Lee Moore Elementary School
 Marguerite Vann Elementary School
 Theodore Jones  Elementary School
 Woodrow Cummins Elementary School

In 2011, Jim Stone Elementary School received top honors from the U.S. Department of Education (ED) in being named a National Blue Ribbon School.

And then in 2013, Ellen Smith Elementary School also received top honors from the U.S. Department of Education (ED) in being named a National Blue Ribbon School.

Pre-School Center:
 Sallie Cone Pre-School Center

Notable alumni
 Peyton Hillis - American Football running back for the Denver Broncos, Cleveland Browns, Kansas City Chiefs, Tampa Bay Buccaneers, and New York Giants of the National Football League, from 2008–2014. He was also featured on the cover of the Madden NFL 12 video game. 
 Greg Lasker - American Football safety for the New York Giants, Chicago Bears, & Phoenix Cardinals of the National Football League, from 1986–1988. He was a member of the Giants Super Bowl XXI championship team.
 Marvin Delph - American basketball shooting guard for the Buffalo Braves of the NBA, 1978. Member of the famed "Triplets" at the University of Arkansas, along with Ron Brewer and Sidney Moncrief, who led the Razorbacks to the 1977, 1978, and 1979 Southwest Conference championship, and the NCAA Final Four in 1978. Delph also led Conway to back-to-back state championships in 1973 and 1974. 
 Bryce Molder - professional golfer on the PGA Tour, from 2001–present. Won the 2006 Miccosukee Championship, and the 2011 Frys.com Open. 
 Ernie Ruple - American Football offensive tackle for the Pittsburgh Steelers of the National Football League, 1968. He was a freshman on the 1964 Arkansas Razorbacks football team that finished 11-0, and won the 1964 college football national championship. He was also named to the 1967 All-Southwest Conference football team.

References

External links
 Conway Public Schools

School districts in Arkansas
Conway, Arkansas
Education in Faulkner County, Arkansas